The Lihpao Outlet Mall is an outlet shopping mall located in Houli District, Taichung, Taiwan. It has introduced about 200 brands and established the only pet-friendly mall in Taiwan. The first phase was designed with the concept of Portofino, Italy. It was put into trial operation on December 24, 2016, and officially opened on January 15, 2017. The second phase of the shopping mall was designed based on the concept of the northern Italian summer resort Lake Como. The entire area has a central canal running through it, plus the lakeside and canal. There is a  park at the entrance and between the first phase of the shopping mall. There is a sky bridge connection. The second phase of the mall started trial operation on December 25, 2019, and officially opened on January 18, 2020.

Transportation
The mall is accessible by bus from Fengyuan Station of Taiwan Railways.

Gallery

See also
 List of tourist attractions in Taiwan
 Lihpao Land

References

External links

2017 establishments in Taiwan
Outlet malls in Taiwan
Shopping malls in Taichung
Shopping malls established in 2017